

Gottlieb Hering (2 June 1887 – 9 October 1945) was an SS commander of Nazi Germany. He served in Action T4 and later as the second and last commandant of Bełżec extermination camp during Operation Reinhard. Hering directly perpetrated the genocide of Jews and other peoples during The Holocaust.

Early life
Hering was born and raised in Warmbronn, a district in the town of Leonberg. After finishing his schooling, Hering worked on a farm near his home.  From 1907 to 1909, he served in the 20th (2nd Württemberg) Uhlans "King William I" regiment, and then voluntarily stayed on for another three years. Hering then joined the Heilbronn police in 1912.  In 1914, Hering married and had one son.

During the First World War, Hering was called to serve in the machine gun company of Grenadier Regiment 123 in 1915, with which he fought on the Western Front in northern France until the armistice in 1918.  He attained the rank of sergeant.  For his war services he was awarded the Iron Cross First Class. After the First World War, Hering briefly rejoined the Schutzpolizei in Heilbronn.

Police and SS career
Hering began his police career in 1919 as a detective (sergeant) in the criminal police (Kriminalpolizei, or Kripo) in Göppingen, near Stuttgart, making officer rank by 1929.  In 1920, Hering had joined the Social Democratic Party of Germany.  During the Weimar Republic era he initiated vigorous actions against the NSDAP, SA and SS and consequently was called a "Nazi-eater".  By the 1933 Nazi Seizure of Power ("Machtergreifung"), Nazi Party members vehemently demanded Hering's dismissal from the police.  However, Hering had known Nazi Christian Wirth from official contexts since 1912, and while working in the Kripo in Stuttgart, the two became acquaintances, so that Hering was able to continue working despite the violent protests of local SA and SS men.  In May 1933 Hering finally joined the NSDAP.  In 1934 he was appointed head of the Göppingen Kripo and then continued his career in 1939 in Stuttgart-Schwenningen.  After the outbreak of World War II, Hering, along with other senior Kripo officers, was transferred to Gotenhafen (Gdynia) in December 1939.  He was appointed with the task of resettling Volksdeutsche to the General Government.

Action T4

Beginning in late 1940, Hering held various functions within the Action T4 "euthanasia" program.  Having completed the order at Gdynia, he was transferred to work first at Sonnenstein Euthanasia Centre.  Hering served as an assistant supervisor (as did Fritz Tauscher) to a police officer by the name of Schemel.  After Sonnenstein, Hering became the office manager at Hartheim Euthanasia Centre.  He also worked in the special registry offices of Bernburg and Hadamar euthanasia centres.

Operation Reinhard
After Action T4, Hering was posted briefly to the Sicherheitsdienst in Prague in June 1942, and was then transferred to Operation Reinhard in Lublin, Poland. He replaced Christian Wirth as commandant of Bełżec extermination camp at the end of August 1942.
 

Rudolf Reder, one of only two survivors of Bełżec, wrote of Hering's role in the killing of Jews.

Tadeusz Misiewicz, a Pole who lived in the village of Bełżec and worked at the train station, testified about Hering (file No.: Ds. 1604/45 – Zamość. Dated 15 October 1945 / Belzec-OKBZ):

Later career and death
After the termination of Operation Reinhard and the closure of Belzec in June 1943, Hering remained the commander of the Poniatowa concentration camp reassigned as subcamp of Majdanek from the forced labor camp supporting the German war effort.  On 3–4 November 1943, German police killed the remaining Jews at Poniatowa during Aktion Erntefest.  Hering then joined fellow SS men from the Operation Reinhard staff in Trieste, Italy. On 9 October 1945, Hering died of mysterious complications in the waiting room of St. Catherine's Hospital in Stetten im Remstal.

Bibliography
 Ernst Klee: Das Personenlexikon zum Dritten Reich: Wer war was vor und nach 1945. Frankfurt on Main: Fischer-Taschenbuch-Verlag, 2005, .
 Fritz Bauer Institut (Hrsg.): Arisierung im Nationalsozialismus – Jahrbuch 2000 zur Geschichte und Wirkung des Holocaust. Frankfurt on Main: Campus, 2000, .
 Wedekind, Michael: Nationalsozialistische Besatzungs- und Annexionspolitik in Norditalien 1943 bis 1945: Die Operationszonen „Alpenvorland“ und „Adriatisches Küstenland“ (= Militärgeschichtliche Studien 38). Edited by Militärgeschichtliches Forschungsamt, Munich: R. Oldenbourg, 2003, .
 Israel Gutman (ed.): Enzyklopädie des Holocaust: Die Verfolgung und Ermordung der europäischen Juden, München / Zürich: Piper, 1998, .

References

1887 births
1945 deaths
Belzec extermination camp personnel
SS-Hauptsturmführer
Aktion T4 personnel
Nazi concentration camp commandants
People from Leonberg
German police officers
Recipients of the Iron Cross (1914), 1st class
Military personnel of Württemberg
Holocaust perpetrators in Poland